Between Us is the third studio album by Murray Head. It was released in 1979.

Track listing
All songs written by Murray Head.
"Los Angeles" - 4:17
"How Many Ways" - 3:58
"Rubbernecker" - 4:43
"Mademoiselle" - 4:06
"Sorry, I Love You" - 5:39
"Country Man" - 4:13
"It's So Hard Singing the Blues Lady" - 4:36
"Good Old Days" - 4:20
"Lady I Could Serve You Well" - 4:54
"Bye, Bye, Bye" - 4:07

Personnel
Murray Head - vocals, harmonium (track 5), rhythm guitar (tracks 4, 6 and 7), backing vocals
Jim Cregan - acoustic guitar (track 4)
Bob Weston - guitar
Geoffrey Richardson - guitar, mandolin, bass
Chris Laurence - double bass (track 4)
John G. Perry - bass guitar
Rupert Hine - keyboards (all tracks), lujon (track 9), arklong (track 10), harmonica (track 2), autoharp (track 5), percussion, backing vocals
Simon Jeffes - organ, string arrangements
Peter Vietch - accordion (track 2)
Trevor Morais - drums, percussion
Anthony Head, Bob Freeman, Dan Owen, Pam Keevil - backing vocals
Gavin Wright - string leader
Andrew McGee, Anthony Pleeth, Dave Takeno, Graham Scott, Ian Anderson, Jan Schlapp, Norbert Blume, Peter Oxer, Roger Smith - string
Technical
Peter Kelsey, Robin Black, Simon Nye - engineer
Clive Arrowsmith - artwork, photography

Releases
 CD Between Us MSI Music Distribution / United States of Distribution 2001
 CD Between Us [Bonus Tracks] United States of Distribution 2003
 CD Between Us Headcase 2006
 CD Between Us Culture Factory 2012

References
[ Between Us] at Allmusic.
Between Us at the official Murray Head site.

Murray Head albums
1979 albums
Albums produced by Rupert Hine
Philips Records albums
Albums recorded at Morgan Sound Studios